125th meridian may refer to:

125th meridian east, a line of longitude east of the Greenwich Meridian
125th meridian west, a line of longitude west of the Greenwich Meridian